Leonardo Michael Flores Ozuna (Los Mina, 26 July 1986 – 30 April 2014 San Adrián de Besós), known by his stage name Monkey Black, was a singer of urban music from the Dominican Republic.

Early life 
Flores was born in Los Mina, Santo Domingo July 26, 1986, and  recorded his first material with El Sujeto at age 10. He then emigrated to Puerto Rico where he dedicated himself to various trades.

Career 
When he returned to the Dominican Republic, Flores became an urban artist. In 2006, he collaborated with Big K. Together they recorded the CD entitled Tienen Miedo. This album and the support of Lápiz Conciente helped him become widely known. Monkey Black was best known for his raps and his collaboration with American rapper, Pitbull, on the song "El Sol y La Playa" which was produced by Nico Clinico.

Personal life 
Eventually, Flores moved to Spain and married. He died 30 April 2014, stabbed during a fight in Sant Adrià de Besòs, Barcelona, Spain, where he had resided for 4 years.

Discography 
 Ultra Mega Universal (Album) (Semi-Inedited)

References

External links
Fox News article about Monkey Black, published soon after his death

1986 births
2014 deaths
Dominican Republic rappers
Spanish-language singers
Caribbean musicians
Dominican Republic hip hop musicians